Sheikh Sabah Julub Falih al-Saedi is an Iraqi politician, who served as a member of the Council of Representatives of Iraq for the Shia Islamic Virtue Party until 2014. He was the deputy chairman of the parliament's Integrity Committee. 

Following the Iraqi legislative election of December 2005 al-Saedi acted as a spokesman of the 15 elected MPs of the Islamic Virtue Party.

References 

Members of the Council of Representatives of Iraq
Living people
Islamic Virtue Party politicians
1974 births
People from Basra